Orfeo is Italian for Orpheus, a figure in Greek mythology who was chief among poets and musicians.

Opera
 L'Orfeo, a 1607 opera by Claudio Monteverdi
 La morte d'Orfeo, a 1619 opera by Stefano Landi
 Orfeo (Rossi), a 1647 opera by Luigi Rossi
 Orfeo (Sartorio), a 1672 opera by Antonio Sartorio
La Descente d'Orphée aux enfers H.488 (1686), opera by Marc-Antoine Charpentier
 Orfeo ed Euridice, a 1762 opera by Christoph Willibald Gluck
 L'Orfeide, a 1925 opera by Gian Francesco Malipiero

People
 Orfeo Vecchi (1551–1603), Italian composer
 Orfeo Boselli (1597–1667), Italian sculptor
 Orfeo Orfei (1836–1915), Italian painter
 Orfeo Angelucci (1912–1993), "contactee" who claimed to be in contact with extraterrestrials

Other
 Sir Orfeo, a Middle English narrative poem
 Orfeo (novel), a novel by Richard Powers
 Orfeo (record label), a German record company
 Orfeo (spider), genus of spiders
 Orfeo Programme, a planned European Space Agency mission
 Orfeo Superdomo, a sports arena in Argentina
 Orfeo toolbox, image processing software
 Samba de Orfeu, song by jazz saxophonist Paul Desmond
 Orfeo, song by Italian and French singer Dalida

See also 
 Orfei, an Italian family name
 Orpheus (disambiguation), the English and German spelling
 Orphée (disambiguation), the French spelling
 Orfeas (disambiguation), Ορφέας, the Greek spelling
 Orfeu (disambiguation), the Portuguese spelling
 Orfey (disambiguation), Орфей, the Russian spelling